In ancient Greek religion, Ananke, from the common noun , "force, constraint, necessity") is the personification of inevitability, compulsion and necessity. She is customarily depicted as holding a spindle. One of the Greek primordial deities, the births of Ananke and her brother and consort, Chronos (the personification of Time, not to be confused with the Titan Cronus) were thought to mark the division between the eon of Chaos and the beginning of the cosmos. Ananke is considered the most powerful dictator of fate and circumstance. Mortals and gods alike respected her power and paid her homage. Sometimes considered the mother of the Fates, she is thought to be the only being to influence their decisions (according to some sources, excepting Zeus also). According to Schowalter and Friesen, she and the Fates "are all sufficiently tied to early Greek mythology to make their Greek origins likely."

The ancient Greek traveller Pausanias wrote of a temple in ancient Corinth where the goddesses Ananke and Bia (meaning force, violence or violent haste) were worshiped together in the same shrine. Ananke is also frequently identified or associated with Aphrodite, especially Aphrodite Ourania, the representation of abstract celestial love; the two were considered to be related, as relatively unanthropomorphised powers that dictated the course of life. Her Roman counterpart is Necessitas ("necessity").

Etymology 
"Ananke" is derived from the common Ancient Greek noun , meaning "force, constraint or necessity." The common noun itself is of uncertain etymology. Homer refers to her being as necessity, often abstracted in modern translation ("it is necessary to fight") or force ("by force"). In Ancient Greek literature the word is also used meaning "fate" or "destiny" ("fate by the daemons or by the gods"), and by extension "compulsion or torture by a superior." She appears often in poetry, as Simonides does: "Even the gods don't fight against ananke".

The pre-modern is carried over and translated (by reduction) into a more modern philosophical sense as "necessity", "logical necessity", or "laws of nature".

Mythology 

In Orphic mythology, Ananke is a self-formed being who emerged at the dawn of creation with an incorporeal, serpentine form, her outstretched arms encompassing the cosmos. Ananke and Chronos are mates, mingling together in serpent form as a tie around the universe. Together they have crushed the primal egg of creation of which constituent parts became earth, heaven and sea to form the ordered universe. Ananke is the mother (or another identity) of Adrasteia, the distributor of rewards and punishments.

In the Orphic hymns, Aphrodite Ourania is described as the mother of Ananke and ruler of the three Moirai:

Mother of the Moirai 
The Greek philosopher, Plato in his Republic discussed the parentage of the Moirai or the Fates in the following lines:And there were another three who sat round about at equal intervals, each one on her throne, the Moirai (Moirae, Fates), daughters of Ananke, clad in white vestments with filleted heads, Lakhesis (Lachesis), and Klotho (Clotho), and Atropos (Atropus), who sang in unison with the music of the Seirenes, Lakhesis singing the things that were, Klotho the things that are, and Atropos the things that are to be . . . Lakhesis, the maiden daughter of Ananke (Necessity).

While Aeschylus, the famous tragedian gave us an account in his Prometheus Bound where the Moirai were called the helmsman of the goddess Ananke along with the three Erinyes:Prometheus: Not in this way is Moira (Fate), who brings all to fulfillment, destined to complete this course. Only when I have been bent by pangs and tortures infinite am I to escape my bondage. Skill is weaker by far than Ananke (Necessity).Chorus: Who then is the helmsman of Ananke (Necessity)?Prometheus: The three-shaped (trimorphoi) Moirai (Moirae, Fates) and mindful (mnêmones) Erinyes (Furies).Chorus: Can it be that Zeus has less power than they do? Prometheus: Yes, in that even he cannot escape what is foretold. Chorus: Why, what is fated for Zeus except to hold eternal sway? Prometheus: This you must not learn yet; do not be over-eager. Chorus: It is some solemn secret, surely, that you enshroud in mystery.Here Prometheus speaks of a secret prophecy, rendered ineluctable by Ananke, that any son born of Zeus and Thetis would depose the god. (In fact, any son of Thetis was destined to be greater than his father.)

In philosophical thought 
In the Timaeus, Plato has the character Timaeus (not Socrates) argue that in the creation of the universe, there is a uniting of opposing elements, intellect ('nous') and necessity ('ananke'). Elsewhere, Plato blends abstraction with his own myth making: "For this ordered world (cosmos) is of a mixed birth: it is the offspring of a union of Necessity and Intellect. Intellect prevailing over Necessity by persuading (from Peitho, goddess of persuasion) it to direct most of the things that come to be toward what is best, and the result of this subjugation of Necessity to wise persuasion is the initial formation of the universe" (48a, trans. John M. Cooper).In Victor Hugo's novel Notre-Dame of Paris, the word "Ananke" is written upon a wall of Notre-Dame by the hand of Dom Claude Frollo. In his Toute la Lyre, Hugo also mentions Ananke as a symbol of love. In 1866, he wrote:

Sigmund Freud in Civilization and Its Discontents (p. 140) said: "We can only be satisfied, therefore, if we assert that the process of civilization is a modification which the vital process experiences under the influence of a task that is set it by Eros and instigated by Ananke — by the exigencies of reality; and that this task is one of uniting separate individuals into a community bound together by libidinal ties."

Wallace Stevens, in a poem of the 1930s, writes: "The sense of the serpent in you, Ananke, / And your averted stride / Add nothing to the horror of the frost / That glistens on your face and hair." This connects with Stevens's sense of necessity or fate in his later work, especially in the collection The Auroras of Autumn.

There is reference to Ananke early in John Banville's novel The Infinities. In explaining how the gods fashioned humans so that they would procreate, the narrator (Hermes) says that the gods gave humans lust, "Eros and Ananke working hand in hand".

Norbert Wiener, in his book Cybernetics: Or Control and Communication in the Animal and the Machine, presents Ananke as the personification of scientific determinism, contrasted with Tyche as the personification of quantum indeterminacy, in the often-quoted sentence: "The chance of the quantum theoretician is not the ethical freedom of the Augustinian, and Tyche is as relentless a mistress as Ananke."

Robert Bird's essay "Ancient Terror", inspired by Léon Bakst's painting Terror Antiquus", speculates on the evolution of Greek religion, tracing it to an original belief in a single, supreme goddess. Vyacheslav Ivanov suggests that the ancients viewed all that is human and all that is revered as divine as relative and transient: "Only Fate (Eimarmene), or universal necessity (Ananke), the inevitable 'Adrasteia,' the faceless countenance and hollow sound of unknown Destiny, was absolute." Before the goddess, who is both indestructible Force of Love and absolute Fate the Destroyer, Life-Giver and Fate-Death, as well as incorporating Mnemosyne (Memory) and Gaia (Mother Earth), masculine daring and warring are impotent and transient, and the masculine order imposed by Zeus and the other Olympian Gods is artificial.

In popular culture 

In Philip K. Dick's novel VALIS, Ananke is mentioned as "blind necessity or blind chance, according to some experts ... chaos, in other words", which reason, Noos, tries to constrain.

In Robertson Davies' novel The Cunning Man, Dr. Jonathan Hullah recognizes Ananke as having ultimate power over all the destinies he watches unfold, including his own.

"Ananke" is the title of a science fiction short story by Stanisław Lem, one of the Tales of Pirx the Pilot. The term is here used in the sense of obsession (Anankastic personality disorder), and serves as the key to a disastrous spaceship accident.

Ananke is a prominent figure in all the books of Kelly McCullough's Ravirn series, under the name "Necessity."

In Kieron Gillen and Jamie McKelvie's comic book series The Wicked + The Divine, Ananke is the immortal caretaker of the Gods of The Recurrence.

In the manga and anime Mobile Suit Gundam, the flagship of the Earth Federation armada at the Battle of Loum is named Ananke. The choice of the ship as flagship is parenthetically noted by a character as an intimation of the overwhelming material superiority of the Federation.

In A Court of Silver Flames by Sarah J. Maas one of the Valkyries and priestesses is called Ananke.

References

External links 
 Theoi Project - Ananke
 Multi-lingual Dictionary
 Greek Mythological Link: Ananke

Destiny
Greek goddesses
Personifications in Greek mythology
Time and fate goddesses
Greek primordial deities
Snake goddesses
Personifications